David Francis Caygill  (born 15 November 1948) is a former New Zealand politician. Caygill was born and raised in Christchurch. He entered politics in 1971 as Christchurch's youngest city councillor at the age of 22. He served as a Member of Parliament (MP) from 1978 to 1996, representing the Labour Party. A supporter of Rogernomics, he served as Minister of Finance between 1988 and 1990. From 2010 to 2019, he was one of the government-appointed commissioners at Environment Canterbury.

Early life and family
Caygill was born in Christchurch on 15 November 1948, the son of Gwyneth Mary Caygill (née Harris) and Bruce Allot Caygill. He was educated at St Albans Primary School and Christchurch Boys' High School, and then studied at the University of Canterbury, graduating Bachelor of Arts in 1971 and Bachelor of Laws in 1974. In 1971 Caygill was President of the University of Canterbury Students' Association from 1975 to 1978.

In 1974, he married Eileen Ellen Boyd, and the couple went on to have four children. From 1975 to 1978 he practised law with a Christchurch legal firm.

Political career
Caygill's early political philosophies were aligned with the National Party and he chaired the St Albans branch of the Young Nationals as a schoolboy. His allegiance switched to Labour in part due to the Vietnam War, which Labour opposed.

Local-body politics
Upon the urging of Neville Pickering, Caygill successfully ran for the Christchurch City Council in 1971, and served until 1980. On 29 April 1974, he became the city's youngest ever acting Mayor for a period of five days. He was chair of the council's staff and community services committee.

From 1977 to 1980 he was a member of the Canterbury Regional Planning Authority and was chairman of the Authority's air pollution committee. He was also a council member of Christchurch Polytechnic.

Member of Parliament

Caygill was first elected to Parliament at the 1978 general election as MP for the Christchurch electorate of St Albans. He served for six terms. Caygill was described as one of the most energetic new members elected at the 1978 election. Just under a year later in a reshuffle in October 1979 Caygill was promoted by Labour leader Bill Rowling and given the economic development portfolio.

In March 1981 he had his responsibilities switched and was instead appointed Shadow Minister of Local Government. His duties changed again in February 1982 and he became Shadow Minister of Energy. When David Lange replaced Rowling leader he appointed Caygill as Shadow Minister of Trade and Industry in March 1983.

Lange Ministry (1984–1989)
When the Fourth Labour Government was formed after the 1984 elections, Caygill aligned himself with Roger Douglas, the controversial Minister of Finance. Douglas, Caygill, and Richard Prebble were together dubbed "the Treasury Troika", and were responsible for most of the economic reform undertaken by the Labour government. The "Rogernomics" reforms, which were based on free market economic theory, were unpopular with many traditional Labour supporters, but Caygill managed to avoid the worst of the condemnation directed towards Douglas and Prebble. When the two became founding members of the ACT New Zealand political party in 1994, Caygill chose not to join them.

Caygill was appointed by the new Prime Minister, David Lange, as Minister of Trade and Industry, and Minister of National Development, on 26 July 1984. In 1987, after Labour had been re-elected, he was appointed Minister of Health. As health minister he rejected the orthodoxy of the Gibbs report, which sought to create a more competition oriented hospital service.

Minister of Finance (1988–1990)
When Douglas was fired by Prime Minister Lange, Caygill was appointed Minister of Finance in his place. After Lange himself had resigned, Caygill retained his position under both Geoffrey Palmer and Mike Moore, Lange's short-lived successors as Prime Minister. As finance minister he passed the "inflation busting" Reserve Bank Act. He also became Minister of Revenue, but dropped the health portfolio.

In his last budget as Minister of Finance, Caygill lifted the quarantining of rental losses on investment property, allowing an investor to offset losses on their investment property against their other taxable income. Caygill was described as a consummate back-room politician; "Calm, utterly discreet, yet equally forceful, he [Caygill] is said to have people march angrily into his room then leave it an hour later smiling — even if they have lost the argument."

Opposition (1990–1996)
After the defeat of the Fourth Labour Government in November 1990 Caygill became Shadow Minister of Finance. In December 1991 Caygill was replaced as finance spokesperson by Michael Cullen, who was more moderate in his economic policies. Caygill continued to hold a senior position in the Labour Party and was instead appointed Shadow Minister of Justice and Energy.

After Labour's narrow defeat at the 1993 election, Helen Clark won the leadership of the party. At the same time Caygill replaced her as deputy leader defeating Cullen by the narrow margin of 23 votes to 21. He cited Sir Geoffrey Palmer as a role model for his deputy leadership. Under Clark he was Deputy Leader of the Opposition as well as Shadow Attorney-General. In June 1995 after Labour MP Margaret Austin defected from Labour to form a new party, United New Zealand, Caygill replaced her as Shadow Minister of Education. He supported Clark in an attempt to oust her as leader in favour of frontbencher Phil Goff in the lead up to the 1996 election.

Over the course of the parliamentary term Caygill had been privately contemplating retiring from politics. On 7 June he informed Clark that he had decided to stand down at the election. Caygill announced his retirement on 11 June 1996 to a surprised caucus, after which Cullen was elected as his successor as deputy leader unopposed. He said there had been no pressure on him to quit but hoped it would provide the "circuit-breaker" to Labour's troubles. At the 1996 election, Caygill retired from Parliament.

Life after politics

After leaving politics, Caygill returned to his original occupation, law. For some time, he was a partner at Buddle Findlay, a prominent law firm. He also worked for a number of government bodies, and was chair of the Accident Compensation Corporation. He chaired a ministerial inquiry into the New Zealand electricity market in 2000, and was appointed chairman of the Electricity Commission in 2007. He is a board member of the Energy Efficiency and Conservation Authority. He is the chair of the Education New Zealand Trust.

From 2010 to 2019, Caygill was one of the commissioners at Environment Canterbury appointed by the National Government. He held the role of deputy chair. Caygill was appointed, in December 2010, as the Chair of the 2011 NZ ETS Review Panel.

Honours and awards
In 1990, Caygill was awarded the New Zealand 1990 Commemoration Medal. In the 1997 New Year Honours, he was appointed a Companion of the New Zealand Order of Merit, for public services. He was conferred an honorary Doctor of Commerce degree by Victoria University of Wellington in 2004.

Notes

References

|-

|-

|-

|-

|-

1948 births
Living people
Companions of the New Zealand Order of Merit
New Zealand finance ministers
New Zealand Labour Party MPs
20th-century New Zealand lawyers
Christchurch City Councillors
Members of the Cabinet of New Zealand
New Zealand MPs for Christchurch electorates
Members of the New Zealand House of Representatives
Canterbury regional councillors
People educated at Christchurch Boys' High School
University of Canterbury alumni